Tamara Castro (4 December 1972 – 8 December 2006) was a famous singer of Argentine folk music.

Biography

Early years 
Castro was born on December 4, 1972, in Ensenada, but grew up and spent most of her life in Brandsen, both located in Buenos Aires Province. Beginning in childhood, she engaged in dance, choir and theater, and received her first guitar at the age of 11. After turning 12 she began playing in local clubs and at festivals.

Career 

After finishing high school, Castro attended the Folklore Department of the National University of the Arts in Buenos Aires, where she met the composer and musician Jorge Mlikota. She soon began recording with him, and he performed on her first album, Pasiones, and also composed several of the tracks on that album. Early in her career, while playing at a grill in General Rodríguez to earn a living, she was discovered by Titán Amorena, the owner of the Argentine DBN record label, with whom she signed her first recording contract.

Throughout her career, Castro traveled to perform in the cities and towns of Argentina. In 1998 Castro performed for the first time at the Cosquín Festival and also performed at the Baradero Festival.

Death 

Tamara Castro died on the morning of December 8, 2006, in a car accident that occurred a few kilometers south of Humberto Primo, Argentina, after she had performed in that town at La Fortinera Festival the night before.

Awards 
 The 2007 Gardel Award for Best Album by a Female Artist in the Folklore category, for the album Vital
 The 2008 Gardel Award for Best Album by a Female Artist in the Folklore category, for the album Inéditos

Discography 

1997 – Pasiones
1999 – Revelaciones
2000 – Resplandor
2001 – Lo mejor de mí
2003 – La patria digna
2006 – Vital
2006 – Inéditos

References

1972 births
2006 deaths
Argentine women composers
Argentine composers
Latin music songwriters
20th-century women musicians
20th-century Argentine musicians
Women in Latin music
People from Buenos Aires Province